William Charles Wentworth (August 179020 March 1872) was an Australian pastoralist, explorer, newspaper editor, lawyer, politician and author, who became one of the wealthiest and most powerful figures of early colonial New South Wales.

Through his newspaper The Australian, and as a founder of the Australian Patriotic Association, Wentworth was among the first colonists to promote a nascent form of Australian nationalism. He was also the leading advocate for a political system of self-government in the Australian colonies that was controlled by affluent land-owning squatters, derided by his critics as the "bunyip aristocracy".

Birth
William Charles Wentworth was born on the vessel HMS Surprize off the coast of the penal settlement of Norfolk Island in August 1790 to D'Arcy Wentworth and Catherine Crowley. Catherine was a convict while his father, D'Arcy, was a member of the aristocratic Anglo-Irish Wentworth family, who had avoided prosecution for highway robbery by accepting the position of assistant surgeon in the colony of New South Wales.

Due to his mother being a felon and his conception being out of wedlock, confusion has existed around the exact date of William Wentworth's birth. His father, however, acknowledged him as a legitimate son and he became a part of colonial society as a Wentworth family member.

Early life
As a young boy William Wentworth moved from Norfolk Island to Sydney with his parents and younger brothers in 1796. The family lived at Parramatta, where his father became a prosperous landowner. His mother died in 1800. In 1803, William and his brothers Dorset and Matthew, were sent to England to be educated at an exclusive school run by Alexander Crombie in Greenwich.

Wentworth failed to gain entry into both the East India Company College and the Royal Military Academy and with his career prospects blunted, he returned to Sydney in 1810.  He became a jockey, riding his father's horse Gig to victory at Hyde Park in the first official horse races on Australian soil.

Crossing the Blue Mountains

In 1813 Wentworth, along with Gregory Blaxland and William Lawson, led the expedition which found a route across the Blue Mountains west of Sydney and opened up the grazing lands of inland New South Wales. Wentworth kept a journal of the exploration which begins by describing the first day of the journey:

On the Eleventh of May our party consisting of Mr. Gregory Blaxland, Lieutenant Lawson and Myself with four servants quitted Mr. Gregory Blaxland's farm on the South Creek and on the 29th of the June Month descended from the Mountain into forest land having travelled as nearly as I can compute about 60 Miles.

In the journal, Wentworth describes the landscapes they were exploring:

A country of so singular a description could in my opinion only have been produced by some Mighty convulsion in Nature.

The town of Wentworth Falls in the Blue Mountains commemorates his role in the expedition. As a reward he was granted another .

In 1814 Wentworth continued his adventurous lifestyle by joining a sandalwood-getting voyage to the South Pacific aboard the Cumberland under Captain Philip Goodenough. This vessel reached Rarotonga where conflict with the local people resulted in five of the crew being killed. Wentworth was nearly killed himself but with the aid of a pistol, he was able to flee to the Cumberland which sailed back to Sydney.

Studying in England
Wentworth returned to England in 1816 where he studied law at the Magdalene and Peterhouse colleges at Cambridge University. He became a barrister and was admitted to the bar in 1822.

He became involved in literary pursuits, publishing a number of notable works. He created a minor stir in 1816 by anonymously publishing a satirical verse attacking the Lieutenant-Governor of New South Wales, George Molle. In 1819 he published a book entitled: A Statistical, Historical, and Political Description of the Colony of New South Wales and Its Dependent Settlements in Van Diemen's Land. In this book Wentworth advocated for an elected assembly for New South Wales, free press, trial by jury and settlement of Australia by free emigrants rather than convicts. It served as the source material for the first theatrical play set in Van Diemen's Land (modern-day Tasmania), the bushranging melodrama Michael Howe the Terror! of Van Diemen’s Land, which premiered in London in 1821.

In 1823 he also published an epic poem Australasia, which contained the lines:

And, O Britannia!... may this—thy last-born infant—then arise,
To glad thy heart, and greet thy parent eyes;
And Australasia float, with flag unfurl'd,
A new Britannia in another world!

In between studying and writing, Wentworth also travelled to Europe, spending much of his time in Paris. He formulated an idea of establishing himself as a leader of a pastoral aristocracy in New South Wales and attempted to arrange his marriage with Elizabeth Macarthur, the daughter of the highly influential colonist John Macarthur. Wentworth however failed in this attempt after arguing with the Macarthur patriarch over his convict heritage and a loan.

Influential colonist in New South Wales

Wentworth returned to Sydney in 1824, accompanied by fellow barrister Robert Wardell. He actively campaigned for the introduction of self-government and trial by jury in the colony by establishing with Wardell The Australian newspaper, the colony's first privately owned paper. With an editorial leaning toward the rights of ex-convicts (known as emancipists), the paper was in frequent conflict with Governor Ralph Darling, who attempted unsuccessfully to have it banned in 1826. Wentworth also became a director of the Bank of New South Wales in 1825.

In 1827, Wentworth's father, D'Arcy Wentworth, died and William inherited much of his highly valuable assets and property, becoming one of the wealthiest men in the colony. He purchased land in eastern Sydney at Vaucluse and built a mansion named Vaucluse House. Wentworth also acquired property in Homebush and in 1827 he received a grant of 12,000 acres of prime land along the Hunter River at Luskintyre.

Becoming a powerful squatter

Wentworth expanded his property holdings, obtaining large pastoral grazing licenses throughout New South Wales. In 1832 he acquired land at Gammon Plains and in 1836 he bought the Windermere estate expanding his Hunter River holdings. In the 1830s he formed partnerships with Captain Thomas Raine and John Christie in taking up land along the Macquarie River from Narromine to Haddon Rig. In the 1840s with John Charles Lloyd, he acquired further massive landholdings along the Namoi River and at Manilla. In the Murrumbidgee River region, Wentworth employed Augustus Morris to establish huge squatting licenses in his name.

Some of these properties were immense and became famous as highly valuable sheep and cattle stations. These included the 120,000 acre Yanko property, the 200,000 acre Tala station, the Wambianna cattle property and the Galathra and Burburgate holdings. Wentworth was able to obtain most of these vast accumulations of land for only the £10 annual squatting fee, and after stocking them, was able to sell the properties for considerable profit.

In 1839, Wentworth led a consortium of Sydney speculators in an attempt to acquire large amounts of land in New Zealand by duping the resident Māori people. In exchange for approximately £400 worth of trade, Wentworth laid claim to 8 million hectares which amounted to around a third of the entire New Zealand land mass. Governor George Gipps intervened and prevented the transaction from proceeding, openly accusing Wentworth of an outrageous and immoral fraud against the Māori. This heightened the fierce enmity between the squatters and Gipps, with Wentworth, now a leading member of the "squattocracy", swearing "eternal vengeance" against Gipps for his interference.

Conservative politician
During the 1830s, Wentworth continued to push his professed ideals of free emigration, trial by jury, rights for emancipists and elected representation. To further these aims, Wentworth and ex-convict William Bland established in 1835 what is believed to be the first political party in Australia which they named the Australian Patriotic Association. However, by 1840 the political climate in New South Wales had changed and with Wentworth becoming one of the wealthiest and most powerful landholders in the colony, his views became very conservative.

In 1842, the British government passed the Constitution Act for New South Wales which allowed for elected representatives to outnumber those nominated by the Crown in the Legislative Council of New South Wales. The following year, 24 members were elected by eligible land-holding male citizens of the colony. Although these changes seemed to democratise governance in New South Wales, it in fact markedly increased the influence of the wealthy land-holding squatters due to the prerequisite of owning at least £2,000 worth of land in order to be a candidate. Wentworth was elected to the Council in 1843 for City of Sydney and soon became the leader of the conservative party, opposed to the liberal-minded members led by Charles Cowper.

Leader of the "Squattocracy"

Wentworth positioned himself in government as a vocal leader for the wealthy squatters and landowners. He vehemently opposed any reforms that threatened the status of this "squattocracy" class and was instrumental in the removal of Governor Gipps in 1846 who wanted to fund free emigration to the colony through additional tariffs on squatting licences. With Gipps out of the picture, Wentworth was able to facilitate the passing of the Squatters' Act of 1848, which allowed for very favourable long-term pastoral leases to be handed out to the squatters.

Convict transportation to the colony ended in 1840 and with it the squatters lost a very cheap source of labour to work on their properties. Wentworth no longer approved of free European migration to fill the void as this was more costly. With other members of the squattocracy such as James Macarthur, Wentworth advocated for the introduction of indentured Chinese coolie labour and procured them as servants at his Vaucluse mansion and on his grazing properties. Wentworth advanced each coolie six Spanish dollars to be paid back over a five year labour contract. He treated them very poorly and had them punished with jail terms of hard labour for absconding. On one occasion, an interpreter for the Chinese workers was imprisoned for translating their grievances against Wentworth in court.

Wentworth also became a strong supporter of corporal and capital punishment, wishing prisoners could be forced to work on treadmills. He openly advocated for the death penalty, considering it "beneficial to society". In light of these sentiments, the Australian newspaper, the progressive paper that Wentworth was no longer associated with, stated in the early 1850s that Wentworth's opinions were now worth nothing.

In 1853 Wentworth chaired the committee to draft a new constitution for New South Wales, which was to receive full responsible self-government from Britain. His draft provided for a powerful unelected Legislative Council and an elected Legislative Assembly with high property qualifications for voting and membership. He also suggested the establishment of a colonial peerage drawn from the landowning class. He described people without property as "idiots, unfit to have any voice" in parliament. This draft aroused the bitter opposition of the democrats and radicals such as Daniel Deniehy, who ridiculed Wentworth's plans for what he called a "bunyip aristocracy". The draft constitution was substantially changed to make it more democratic, although the Legislative Council remained unelected.

Despite his open prejudice against the poor, Wentworth was a strong supporter of universal education. He backed the introduction of a National School system in 1848 and in 1852 he helped found the University of Sydney.

Views on Aboriginal people
As a young writer in 1819, Wentworth saw Aboriginal Australians as occupying "the lowest place in the gradatory scale of the human species" and took up an active role in denying Aboriginal people any legal protection during the process of colonisation. In 1827 Wentworth was the defense counsel for Lieutenant Nathaniel Lowe who was accused of shooting dead an Aboriginal prisoner. He stated to the court that Englishmen were justified in killing Aborigines as the law did not exist to protect people who were "one degree just above the beasts". Lowe was found not guilty.

Wentworth was also very vocal in supporting the stockmen who were found guilty in 1838 of the slaughter of Aboriginal people during Myall Creek massacre. In 1844, when there was a push to reform the judicial system to allow evidence to be given by Aborigines, Wentworth was vociferous in his opposition. He claimed that the evidence given by "this savage race" would be comparative to the "chatterings of the ourang-outang," and would enable them to "wreak their revenge on the unfortunate white man". When the issue was brought before the Council again in 1849, Wentworth stated that: "It was not the policy of a wise Government to attempt the perpetuation of the aboriginal race of New South Wales by any protective means. They must give way before the arms, aye! even the diseases of civilised nations—they must give way before they attained the power of those nations"

Outside of the court-room, Wentworth also promoted the subjugation of Aboriginal people through more practical means. The first Commandant of the Native Police for the northern districts, Frederick Walker, was a personal friend of Wentworth's who also managed his immense property at Tala on the Murrumbidgee. Wentworth encouraged the establishment and continued funding of the Native Police, a paramilitary force that perpetrated innumerable massacres upon Aboriginal people throughout the second half of the 19th Century.

Return to England

Wentworth retired from the Legislative Council of New South Wales in 1854 and sailed for England in March of that same year. With the rise of free immigration during this gold rush period, his continued advocacy for indentured labour and a colonial peerage system made him an unpopular figure. He was heckled, hissed at and had his speech interrupted by the public during his departure ceremony at Circular Quay.

Once in England, he founded the "General Association for the Australian Colonies", whose object was to obtain a federal assembly for the whole of Australia. He refused several offers of honours, and was a member of the Conservative Party and the Conservative Club. He returned to New South Wales for a brief period in 1860-61 to lead the New South Wales Legislative Council, but otherwise remained in England at his Merly House estate.

Death and burial

Wentworth died on 20 March 1872 at Merley House, Wimborne, Dorset, in England. His combined wealth at the time of his passing was £170,000. At his request his body was returned to Sydney for burial. He was given the colony's first state funeral on 6 May 1873, a day declared by the governor as a public holiday. Around 65,000 people lined the route of the funeral procession to Vaucluse where Wentworth was buried. The Wentworth Mausoleum was soon after constructed over his grave.

Family
On 26 October 1829 at St Philip's Church Hill, Sydney, William Wentworth married Sarah Cox (1805–1880), with whom he had seven daughters and three sons:
 Thomasine Wentworth (1825–1913)
 William Charles Wentworth (1827–1859)
 Fanny Katherine Wentworth (1829–1893)
 Fitzwilliam Wentworth (1833–1915) married Mary Jane Hill, daughter of George Hill
 William Charles Wentworth III (1871–1949) married Florence Denise Griffiths, daughter of George Neville Griffiths
 William Charles Wentworth IV (1907–2003) (known as Bill Wentworth, Liberal member of Parliament 1949–77)
 Diana Wentworth Wentworth married Mungo Ballardie MacCallum (1913–99)
 Mungo Wentworth MacCallum (1941–2020)
 Sarah Eleanor Wentworth (1835–1857)
 Eliza Sophia Wentworth (1838–1898)
 Isabella Christiana (Christina) Wentworth (1840–1856)
 Laura Wentworth (1842–1887) married Henry William Keays-Young in 1872.
 Edith Wentworth (1845–1891) married Rev. Sir Charles Gordon-Cumming-Dunbar, 9th Baronet in 1872.
 D'Arcy Bland Wentworth (1848–1922).

He fathered at least one other child out of wedlock with Jamima Eagar, the estranged wife of Edward Eagar.

Legacy

The towns of Wentworth and Wentworth Falls, the federal Division of Wentworth, an electorate in Sydney's Eastern Suburbs, the Wentworth Falls waterfall, and Wentworth Avenue which runs through the suburb of Kingston in Canberra, were named after him.

In 1963 he was honoured, together with Blaxland and Lawson, on a postage stamp issued by Australia Post depicting the Blue Mountains crossing, and again in 1974 on the anniversary of the first newspaper publication.

The Wentworth Building, built in 1972 to accommodate the University of Sydney Union, was named after him.

Wentworth's clash with Darling was dramatised in the TV series The Patriots (1962).

Another statue of Wentworth is located on the exterior of the Department of Lands building in Sydney.

Works
 A Statistical Account of the British Settlements in Australasia (1819)
 Journal of an expedition, across the Blue Mountains, 11 May-6 June 1813, 1813
 Australasia: a poem written for the Chancellor's Medal at the Cambridge commencement, July 1823, London: G. and W.B. Whittaker, 1823

Sources
 Barton, The Poets and Prose Writers of New South Wales (Sydney, 1866)
  Rusden, History of Australia (London, 1883)
  Sir Bernard Burke.  History of the Colonial Gentry Vol 1: 1891: pps.95-97: Wentworth
  Lewis Deer and John Barr: Australia's First Patriot: The Story of William C. Wentworth: Angus & Robertson Ltd.: Sydney 1911.
  K. R. Cramp, M. A.: William Charles Wentworth of Vaucluse House: A.H. Pettifer Government Printer: Third Edition 1923
  Michael Persse: Wentworth, William Charles (1790–1872)
 Michael Persse. W. C. Wentworth, Oxford University Press, Melbourne 1972 (comprising 30 pages).
 Carol Liston (1988). Sarah Wentworth, Mistress of Vaucluse: Historic Houses Trust of NSW .
 John Ritchie John Ritchie: Obituary. Retrieved 12 December 2012 (1997). The Wentworths: Father and Son. The Miegunyah Press at Melbourne University Press.  .
  Ivy Bailey (1999). Single-handed Patriot: A Story of William Charles Wentworth: Book House: Glebe, NSW. .
 Andrew Tink (2009), William Charles Wentworth: Australia's greatest native son Allen & Unwin. 
  Robert Griffin, Joy Hughes, Anne Toy and Peter Watts: Vaucluse House: A History and Guide: Historic Houses Trust of New South Wales: 3rd Edition 2006.

See also
 Political families of Australia: Wentworth/Hill/Griffiths/Scott/Cooper family
 Wentworth family

References

External links 

 Portrait of William Charles Wentworth (bronze medallion) in the National Portrait Gallery, London
 Portrait of William Charles Wentworth (copy print) digitised and held by the State Library of Queensland
 The Wentworth family
 New South Wales State Library: Catalogue: Crossing the Blue Mountains
 
 
 
 
 

1790 births
1872 deaths
People born at sea
Australian explorers
Explorers of Australia
Members of the New South Wales Legislative Council
Presidents of the New South Wales Legislative Council
Australian journalists
Politicians from Sydney
Writers from New South Wales
Alumni of Peterhouse, Cambridge
Australian Freemasons
19th-century Australian poets
19th-century Australian politicians
19th-century Australian historians
Burials in New South Wales
Australian newspaper proprietors
19th-century newspaper founders
19th-century Australian businesspeople
Lawyers from Sydney